Albert the Fifth Musketeer is an animated series based on the 1844 novel The Three Musketeers by Alexandre Dumas. It is a France Animation, Ravensburger and Cinar co-production, for Children's BBC and Canal+ in association with PolyGram Video, Animation Services Hong Kong Limited and Koroness Filmproduktion GmbH.

Plot 

The show centers around the antics of Albert de Parmagnan, a new member of the Musketeers (the series takes place after the Siege of La Rochelle, and therefore after D'Artagnan has become a musketeer, but before Milady's death). While the other four musketeers are portrayed as bumbling and incompetent, Albert is quick-witted and clever, creating many inventions to get the others out of trouble.

He and the other Musketeers have adventures as they fight with the guards of Cardinal Richelieu and attempt to thwart his plans to take over France.

In total there were 26 episodes, which aired in 1994. The show was later translated into English, Dutch, Swedish, French and Russian and shown in the United Kingdom, Singapore, Thailand, the Netherlands, United States, South Africa, Malaysia, Canada, Australia, Zimbabwe, Sweden, Hong Kong, France and Russia.

Cast 

The characters, apart from Albert (voiced by Jimmy Hibbert), are all generally broad stereotypes of their traditional portrayals in the original Musketeers book and subsequent movies:

 D'Artagnan – brash and impulsive, the self-declared leader of the Musketeers. Voiced by Andy Turvey.
 Athos – rarely says anything, but tends to do everything backwards, including riding his horse. Voiced by Jimmy Hibbert.
 Porthos – large and fat, Porthos is always thinking of his stomach. Voiced by Christian Rodska.
 Aramis – very flirtatious and feminine, often lapses into poetry. Voiced by Mike Drew.
 M. de Tréville – the captain of the King's Musketeers. Voiced by Christian Rodska.
 King Louis XIII – the ruler of France and commissioner of the Musketeers. Childish and moronic, he is easily duped by Richelieu. Voiced by Jimmy Hibbert
 Anne of Austria – the King's wife. Beautiful, but ditsy, she talks in a slight lispy French tone. She often confides privately in Albert with instructions. Voiced by Shireen Shah.
 Cardinal Richelieu – the Prime Minister of France, he seeks to undermine the King's authority at every turn and sends his guards to fight off the meddling Musketeers who threaten to disrupt his plans. Voiced by Mike Drew.
 M'Lady – Richelieu's cunning female assistant. She has a tattoo of a fleur de lis on her shoulder that turns into a quacking duck. Voiced by Susan Sheridan.
 The Duke of Buckingham – the love-crazed suitor of Queen Anne. Voiced by Dick Cadbury.

Episodes

References

External links 
 Cartoon Database
 
 DHX Media page

Television shows based on The Three Musketeers
BBC children's television shows
Television series by Cookie Jar Entertainment
1990s French animated television series
1990s Canadian animated television series
1994 Canadian television series debuts
1994 Canadian television series endings
1994 French television series debuts
1994 French television series endings
Canadian children's animated adventure television series
Canadian children's animated comedy television series
French children's animated adventure television series
French children's animated comedy television series
Television shows set in France
Television series set in the 17th century
1994 British television series debuts
1994 British television series endings
1990s British children's television series
Fictional swordfighters
Fictional French people in television
Canal+ original programming
1990s British animated television series
Cultural depictions of Cardinal Richelieu
Cultural depictions of Louis XIII